Ussara eurythmiella is a species of sedge moth in the genus Ussara. It was described by August Busck in 1914. It is found in Panama.

References

Moths described in 1914
Glyphipterigidae